Fire: From the Unexpurgated Diary of Anaïs Nin (full title Fire: From A Journal of Love: the Unexpurgated Diary of Anaïs Nin (1934–1937)) is a 1995 book that is based on material excerpted from the unpublished diaries of Anais Nin. It corresponds temporally to part of Anaïs Nin's published diaries, but consists mostly of material about her love life that was too sensitive or secret to publish in her lifetime or in that of others involved.

This book is especially notable for her account and her understanding of female sexuality, as well as human nature in general.

Plot summary 
She continues her marriage with Hugh Parker Guiler and her literary and sexual relationship with Henry Miller.  Both these follow her to New York and win her back from Otto Rank.  She returns to Paris and eventually gives up practicing psychoanalysis.  She feels over dependent on Henry and continues to take love where she finds it.  She begins a very passionate affair with the wildly romantic but irresponsible Peruvian, Gonzalo Moré.

Reference

1995 non-fiction books
LGBT literature in France
Diaries of Anaïs Nin